John MacDonald (18 January 1883 – 1915) was a Scottish professional footballer who played as a full-back.

References

1883 births
1915 deaths
Footballers from Ayr
Scottish footballers
Association football fullbacks
Ayr F.C. players
Blackburn Rovers F.C. players
Leeds City F.C. players
Grimsby Town F.C. players
Queens Park Rangers F.C. players
English Football League players